Trams in Frankfurt May refer to:
 Trams in Frankfurt am Main
 Trams in Frankfurt (Oder)